Charles Bénézit (1816 – after 1871) was a French musician, writer, and music teacher.

Biography
Bénézit was a friend and publishing collaborator in Brittany of the young Leconte de Lisle, two years his junior, and the humourist M. Mille in Brittany. He later wrote the musical Jacquerie. Leconte's correspondence contains twelve letters to Charles, mainly from 1845–47. With Leconte de Lisle's encouragement, M. Mille wrote the comic text and Charles Bénézit the music for two vaudevilles, Les Mémoires d'une puce de qualité (une puce de Napoléon Ier!) and L'Orphelin, roman musical.

Later he became a close friend of Victor Hugo. When Napoléon III seized power in 1851, many French exiled in Jersey; Charles and his family, marked as being "from France" were recorded in the Jersey census in 1851, and still in the 1861 and 1871 censuses. Victor Hugo had gone first to Brussels, but in 1855 joined other exiles on Jersey. Bénézit became close and permanent friends with Hugo and maintained the friendship after Hugo returned to France in 1870.

He was father of the art historian Emmanuel Bénézit.

References

1816 births
Year of death missing
French Romantic composers